Stephen Douglas Thorne (February 11, 1953 – May 24, 1986), (Lt Cmdr, USN), was an American naval officer and aviator, test pilot and a NASA astronaut candidate.

He was born on February 11, 1953, in Frankfurt, West Germany, and graduated from the U.S. Naval Academy in 1975. He was a Navy fighter pilot from 1976 until he became a test pilot in 1981.

He was accepted for NASA astronaut training in June 1985, but died in an airplane accident where he was a passenger on May 24, 1986.

He was survived by his wife, Sue Lotz of Staunton, Virginia. His interests included baseball, running, reading, and general aviation.

Education
He graduated from T.L. Hanna High School, Anderson, South Carolina, in 1971 and received a Bachelor of Science  degree in Systems Engineering  from the United States Naval Academy in 1975.

Naval career
Upon graduation from the U.S. Naval Academy, Thorne entered flight training and received his aviator wings in December 1976. After training at the U.S. Naval Test Pilot School in 1981, Thorne spent the next two years at Strike Aircraft Test at the Naval Air Test Center, Patuxent River, Maryland, flying mostly ordnance and weapons systems tests in the F-4 and A-7 Corsair II. He completed F-18 Hornet transition training in October 1984 and joined Strike Fighter Squadron 132 (VFA-132) aboard  until departing for NASA.

He accumulated over 2,500 flying hours and 200 carrier landings in approximately 30 different types of aircraft.

Astronaut experience
Following an unsuccessful application for NASA Astronaut Group 10, Thorne was selected as an astronaut candidate by NASA in June 1985 and in August, commenced a one-year training and evaluation program to qualify him for subsequent assignment as a pilot on future Space Shuttle flights.

Thorne was killed in an aircraft accident of a stunt plane, in which he was a passenger, on May 24, 1986. The stunt plane crashed while performing maneuvers near Santa Fe, Texas, killing Thorne and NASA engineer James Simons. He is buried at Arlington National Cemetery.

Organizations
 Member of the Society of Experimental Test Pilots.
 Life member of the Naval Academy Alumni Association.

Awards
Received Navy Commendation Medal in January 1986.

References

External links
 
 

1953 births
1986 deaths
Accidental deaths in Texas
American astronauts
American aviators
Aviators killed in aviation accidents or incidents in the United States
Burials at Arlington National Cemetery
United States Naval Academy alumni
United States Naval Test Pilot School alumni
Victims of aviation accidents or incidents in 1986